The 2021–22 season is Derthona Basket's 66th in existence and the club's 1st season in the top tier Italian basketball.

Kit 
Supplier: Erreà / Sponsor: Bertram

Players

Current roster
 }}

Depth chart

Squad changes

In 

|}

Out 

|}

Confirmed 

|}

Coach

On loan

Competitions

Supercup

Group stage

Playoffs

Serie A

References 

Tortona